A Girl Like You may refer to:

 "A Girl Like You" (Edwyn Collins song)
 "A Girl Like You" (Easton Corbin song)
 "A Girl Like You" (Cliff Richard and The Shadows song)
 "A Girl Like You" (Dallas Smith song)
 "A Girl Like You" (The Smithereens song)
 "Girl Like You" (Jason Aldean song)
 "Girl Like You" (Toro y Moi song)
 "A Girl Like You", a song by The Wolfgang Press
 "A Girl Like You", a song by The Young Rascals from Groovin'
 "Girls Like You", a song by Maroon 5
 "Girl Like You", by Smash Mouth from Summer Girl

See also
 A Girl Like Me (disambiguation)
 "With a Girl Like You", a 1966 song by the Troggs
 "Never Met A Girl Like You Before", a 1965 song by the Kinks released as the B-side of "See My Friends"